Wicked Game is the sixth studio album by the classical crossover group Il Divo. The album was released on 4 November 2011. Il Divo performed "Wicked Game", their reworking of the Chris Isaak song, on TV in the UK on 5 September on Red or Black? and in the United States on 7 September on the semi-final of America's Got Talent.

In October 2012, it was announced that Il Divo would tour with Katherine Jenkins for the first time, throughout Europe and North America.

Background
In September 2011, the group announced the album on their website. One of the members, Carlos Marin, describes the recording of the new album as "unbelievable - you can really hear the evolution. And that connection between us, the way that the combination produces magic, it's stronger than ever." Swiss member Urs Buhler said he believes this new album will delight you, the fans, as much as it has them. "We think it's the best thing we've ever done."

Track listing
 "Wicked Game (Melanconia)" 
 "Crying (Llorando)"
 "Don't Cry for Me Argentina" 
 "Dov'è l'amore" 
 "Falling Slowly (Te prometo)" 
 "Come What May (Te amare)" 
 "Senza parole"
 "Stay (Ven a mi)"
 "Sempre Sempre" 
 "Time to Say Goodbye (Con te partirò)"

Charts

Weekly charts

Year-end charts

Release history

Certifications

References

2011 albums
Il Divo albums